
Thermidor was restaurant in Kapellebrug, Hulst, in the Netherlands. It was a fine dining restaurant that was awarded one Michelin star in 1973. In 1975, it was again awarded a Michelin star and retained that rating until 1981.

Rien Versprille was head chef.

The building became a gambling house until it was closed down by the Dutch Revenue Service in 2002. The building is demolished after a fire in 2004.

See also
List of Michelin starred restaurants in the Netherlands

References 

Restaurants in the Netherlands
Michelin Guide starred restaurants in the Netherlands
Defunct restaurants in the Netherlands
Restaurants in Zeeland
Hulst